Collecter's Edition Slipcase (also printed as Collector's Edition Slipcase) is a box set collection of three previous albums and a double live album from progressive metal band Opeth.

Track listing
 Disc 1: Blackwater Park
 "The Leper Affinity" – 10:23
 "Bleak" – 9:16
 "Harvest" – 6:01
 "The Drapery Falls" – 10:54
 "Dirge for November" – 7:54
 "The Funeral Portrait" – 8:44
 "Patterns in the Ivy" – 1:53
 "Blackwater Park" – 12:08

 Disc 2:  Deliverance
 "Wreath" – 11:10
 "Deliverance" – 13:36
 "A Fair Judgement" – 10:24
 "For Absent Friends" – 2:17
 "Master's Apprentices" – 10:32
 "By the Pain I See in Others" – 13:51

 Disc 3:  Damnation
 "Windowpane" – 7:45
 "In My Time of Need" – 5:50
 "Death Whispered a Lullaby" – 5:50
 "Closure" – 5:16
 "Hope Leaves" – 4:30
 "To Rid the Disease" – 6:21
 "Ending Credits" – 3:40
 "Weakness" – 4:10

 Discs 4 and 5:  Lamentations (Live at Shepherd's Bush Empire 2003)
 "Introduction" – 1:25
 "Windowpane" – 9:15
 "In My Time of Need" – 6:37
 "Death Whispered a Lullaby" – 7:11
 "Closure" – 9:45
 "Hope Leaves" – 6:11
 "To Rid the Disease" – 7:11
 "Ending Credits" – 4:22
 "Harvest" – 6:15
 "Weakness" – 6:05
 "Master's Apprentice" – 10:34
 "The Drapery Falls" – 10:56
 "Deliverance" – 12:38
 "The Leper Affinity" – 11:01
 "A Fair Judgement" – 13:51

Personnel

Opeth
 Mikael Åkerfeldt − vocals, guitar
 Peter Lindgren − guitar
 Martin Lopez − drums
 Martin Mendez − bass

Guest musicians

Guest musicians on Blackwater Park
 Steven Wilson (Porcupine Tree) − vocals, guitar, piano
 Markus Lindberg

Guest musician on Deliverance
 Steven Wilson (Porcupine Tree) − backing vocals, guitars, Mellotron

Guest musician on Damnation
 Steven Wilson (Porcupine Tree) − Grand piano, Mellotron, Fender Rhodes, backing vocals, lyrics on "Death Whispered a Lullaby"

Guest musician on Lamentations
 Per Wiberg − keyboards, backing vocals

References

Opeth albums
2006 compilation albums
E1 Music compilation albums
Albums with cover art by Travis Smith (artist)